These are the team rosters of the 15 teams competing in the 2013 FIBA Asia Championship.

Group A

Head coach: Hsu Chin-tse

Head coach:  Vangelis Alexandris

Head coach: Chot Reyes

Head coach:  Nenad Krdžić

Group B

Head coach: Wai Cheung Kwong

Head coach: Kimikazu Suzuki

Head coach:  Tom Wisman

Group C

Head coach:  Panagiotis Giannakis

Head coach:  Memi Bečirovič

Head coach: Yoo Jae-hak

Head coach: Teh Choon Yean

Group D

Head coach:  Saša Nikitović

Head coach:  Scott Flemming

Head coach:  Matteo Boniciolli

|}
| valign="top" |
 Head coach

 Assistant coach

Legend
(C) Team captain
Club field describes current pro club
|}

References 
Official website

2013 FIBA Asia Championship
FIBA Asia Cup squads